Maja Komorowska-Tyszkiewicz (born 23 December 1937) is a Polish film actress. She has appeared in over 35 films since 1970.

Selected filmography
 Family Life (1971)
 A Woman's Decision (1975)
 Budapest Tales (1976)
 Spiral (1978)
 The Maids of Wilko (1979)
 A Year of the Quiet Sun (1984)
 Decalogue I (1988)
 Inventory (1989)
 A Tale of Adam Mickiewicz's 'Forefathers' Eve' (1989)
 At Full Gallop (1996)
 Katyń (2007)

Honours and awards
 Gold Cross of Merit (1975)
 Grand Cross of the Order of Polonia Restituta (for outstanding contribution to national culture, for achievements in artistic creativity and teaching activities, 2011; Commander's Cross, 2004; Knight's Cross, 2000)
 Silver Medal of Merit for National Defence (2002)
 Gold Medal for Merit to Culture Gloria Artis - Award of the Minister of Culture and National Heritage in the theatre (2008)

External links
 

1937 births
Living people
Polish film actresses
Actresses from Warsaw
Grand Crosses of the Order of Polonia Restituta
Recipients of the Gold Cross of Merit (Poland)
Recipients of the Gold Medal for Merit to Culture – Gloria Artis
Polish twins
20th-century Polish actresses
21st-century Polish actresses
Maja